Wiggledance! is the fifth video by the children's band the Wiggles and their first full-length concert video. It was filmed during their December 1996 concerts at the Seymour Centre, and released in June 1997.  It was released only to the Australia region.

Song list
 Rock-a-Bye Your Bear
 Can You (Point Your Fingers And Do The Twist?)
 Dorothy the Dinosaur
 Dorothy (Would You Like to Dance?)
 Vini Vini 
 Wags the Dog
 Quack, Quack
 Wake Up Jeff!
 Nya, Nya, Nya
 Five Little Joeys
 Baby Beluga
 Let's Have a Dance with Henry
 Romp Bomp a Stomp
 Hot Potato
 Get Ready to Wiggle

Production
The Wiggles logo was updated to feature a yellow splotch background behind their name.  The Wiggles still wore plain colored shirts in the video with short sleeves instead of long ones.

Due to copyright concerns, the song "Vini Vini" was removed after the video's initial release. The subsequent release of Wiggledance, while retaining the copyright year 1997, have removed this video and its introduction. Former Wiggles member Phillip Wilcher has mentioned that the Wiggles believed that the song was in the public domain but it was claimed by a French composer.

On 4 April 2013, the Wiggles announced the addition of Wiggledance! to their Wiggle Time TV service. In 2019, the 1997 master was released into multiple segments on their YouTube channel as Classic Wiggles in multiple parts.

Cast
The Wiggles are:
 Murray Cook
 Jeff Fatt
 Anthony Field
 Greg Page

Also featuring:
 Paul Paddick as Captain Feathersword
 Leanne Halloran as a police officer, known as Officer Beaples in the TV series. Halloran also plays Henry the Octopus and is the choreographer for the show.
 Donna Halloran as Wags the Dog, and a zookeeper
 Leeanne Ashley as Dorothy the Dinosaur
 Carolyn Ferrie provides the voice for Dorothy

See also
 The Wiggly Big Show
 Live Hot Potatoes!

Notes

References
 Wiggledance! (AUS VIDEO-1997) episode information from TV.com

External links
 

1997 video albums
The Wiggles videos
Australian children's musical films